Páidí Ó Lionáird (born 17 August 1968) is an Irish television presenter and columnist from Cúil Aodha, County Cork. Since 1997, Ó Lionáird has presented current affairs and entertainment shows on the Irish language channel TG4.

His older brother is Iarla Ó Lionáird, a singer and producer. Other brothers include Seán, judge on TG4's Feirm Factor, and Peadar, co-owner of Folláin, jam and chutney manufacturer.

Early life
Páidí Ó Lionáird was born in Gort na Scairte, Baile Bhúirne in the Gaeltacht (Irish-speaking area of Co. Cork) Cúil Aodha, part of the Muskerry Gaeltacht in County Cork. The youngest of twelve, his father was principal of the local secondary school and owner of a small holding of land.

After leaving school, he initially studied Furniture Technology and Design at Dundalk Institute of Technology before using his carpentry skills in London. He eventually ended up working as doorman at such establishments as the Kensington Park Hotel and then as Concierge at the Gloucester Hotel. On his return to Ireland, he was appointed as development officer for Munster with the Irish Language Youth Organisation Ógras. He met his wife Karen in May 1990 at the AGM of Conradh na Gaeilge. They have one son named Naoise and live in South Connemara, Galway.

Having initially studied public relations at University College Cork, Ó Lionáird then qualified as a primary school teacher at MIC Limerick.
His studies continued and he holds a master's degree in Irish Media Studies from MIC and UL. He has taught communications at GMIT and DCU.

Television career
Ó Lionáird's television career began with a successful screen test for TG4 in 1997. He soon became involved with a number of different shows, from the light-hearted Ardán to the hard-headed political and current affairs show 7 Lá.

Ó Lionáird chaired the Irish language debate held between the seven candidates in the 2011 Irish presidential election on 18 October 2011. The high-profile debate was another big ratings win for TG4 and Ó Lionáird's moderation was very well received in the national press.
He joined the RTÉ newsroom based in Baile na hAbhann where he is currently Chief Sub-Editor, Nuacht RTÉ & TG4. He continues to anchor 7Lá and in 2016, chaired TG4's marathon General Election Count Coverage, for 15 successive hours and a further 3 of the following days continued count.

References

1968 births
Living people
Irish television journalists
People from County Cork
TG4 presenters
20th-century Irish people
21st-century Irish people
Alumni of Dundalk Institute of Technology